Yaroslavna of Halych, was a Hungarian queen consort, married to King Stephen III of Hungary. She was a daughter of Prince Yaroslav Osmomysl of Halicz. The marriage took place in 1167. She was repudiated in 1168.

Notes

Hungarian queens consort
Year of birth unknown
Year of death unknown
Place of birth unknown